William Tait is the name of:

William Auld Tait (1826–1900), Canadian pioneer and politician
William W. Tait (born 1929), professor of philosophy at the University of Chicago
William Tait (cricketer), New Zealand cricketer
William Tait (footballer), Association football player during the 1890s and 1900s.
William Tait (publisher) (1793–1864), Scottish publisher best known for Tait's Magazine
 William Tait (MP) (died 1800), Member of Parliament for Stirling Burghs 1797–1800

See also
Willie Tait, British Royal Air Force officer
William Tate (disambiguation)